Cuicirama spectabilis is a species of beetle in the family Cerambycidae. It was described by Blanchard in 1843. It is known from Bolivia and Ecuador.

References

Hemilophini
Beetles described in 1843